John Egli (1921-1982) was a college men's basketball coach.  He was the head coach of Penn State from 1954 to 1968. He coached Penn State to a 187-135 record, making two NCAA tournament appearances.  Egli played college basketball at Penn State.

Head coaching record

References

1921 births
1982 deaths
Basketball coaches from Pennsylvania
Basketball players from Pennsylvania
Penn State Nittany Lions basketball coaches
Penn State Nittany Lions basketball players
Sportspeople from Williamsport, Pennsylvania